The Union Nationale fielded a full slate of 108 candidates under the leadership of Jean-Jacques Bertrand in the 1970 Quebec provincial election. Although it entered the election as the governing party, it won only seventeen seats and emerged as the official opposition in the next sitting of the National Assembly. The party, which had dominated Quebec politics at the provincial level for most of the period since 1936, was never again a serious contender for power after this election.

Candidates
Note: This section is incomplete.

Source:

References

Candidates in Quebec provincial elections
1970